Étienne Pflimlin (born 16 October 1941) is a French high-ranking civil servant and banker. He served as the CEO of the Crédit Mutuel from 1987 to 2010.

Early life
Étienne Pflimlin was born on 16 October 1941 in Thonon-les-Bains, Haute-Savoie, France. His father, Pierre Pflimlin, was a politician.

Pflimlin graduated from the École Polytechnique, Sciences Po and the École nationale d'administration (ENA).

Career
Pflimlin started his career as a high-ranking civil servant. He worked for Prime Minister Pierre Messmer in 1973 and Culture Minister Michel d'Ornano in 1977. He subsequently worked for the Court of Audit.

Pflimlin joined the Crédit Mutuel, a French mutual bank, in 1984. He succeeded Théo Braun as its CEO in 1987, retiring in 2010. He argued that shareholders were a critical part of mutual banking, and that the industry would be over if shareholders stopped being engaged. He earned 630,141 Euros in 2010, 600,000 of which was his net salary. He was succeeded by Michel Lucas.

Pflimlin was elected to the board of the International Co-operative Alliance in 1994. He has served on the board of directors of FIMALAC, a credit rating and risk assessment company, since 2006. Pflimlin first met Ladreit as a student at the ENA.

Pflimlin became a Commander of the Legion of Honour in 2012.

Personal life
Pflimlin is married to Sophie, an editor, and he has two children, Edouard and Thomas. He resides in Strasbourg with his family.

References

Living people
1941 births
People from Thonon-les-Bains
Businesspeople from Strasbourg
École Polytechnique alumni
Sciences Po alumni
École nationale d'administration alumni
French bankers
French corporate directors
Commandeurs of the Légion d'honneur